Amela Fetahović (17 April 1986 – 4 November 2021) was a Bosnian footballer who played as a midfielder for Serbian side Spartak Subotica and in the Bosnian League for SFK Sarajevo. With SFK Sarajevo, she played in the Champions League. She was a member of the Bosnian national team.

Death
Fetahović died on 4 November 2021, aged 35, following a car crash in Sarajevo.

References

External links
 

1986 births
2021 deaths
Bosnia and Herzegovina women's footballers
Bosnia and Herzegovina expatriate women's footballers
Women's association football midfielders
Bosnia and Herzegovina women's international footballers
SFK 2000 Sarajevo players
ŽFK Spartak Subotica players
Bosnia and Herzegovina expatriate sportspeople in Serbia
Expatriate women's footballers in Serbia
Road incident deaths in Bosnia and Herzegovina